The 40th Los Angeles Film Critics Association Awards, given by the Los Angeles Film Critics Association (LAFCA), honored the best in film for 2014.

Winners

Best Picture:
Boyhood
Runner-up: The Grand Budapest Hotel
Best Director:
Richard Linklater – Boyhood
Runner-up: Wes Anderson – The Grand Budapest Hotel
Best Actor:
Tom Hardy – Locke
Runner-up: Michael Keaton – Birdman
Best Actress:
Patricia Arquette – BoyhoodRunner-up: Julianne Moore – Still AliceBest Supporting Actor:
J. K. Simmons – WhiplashRunner-up: Edward Norton – BirdmanBest Supporting Actress:Agata Kulesza – IdaRunner-up: Rene Russo – NightcrawlerBest Screenplay:Wes Anderson – The Grand Budapest HotelRunner-up: Alejandro G. Iñárritu, Nicolás Giacobone, Alexander Dinelaris Jr., and Armando Bó – BirdmanBest Cinematography:Emmanuel Lubezki – BirdmanRunner-up: Dick Pope – Mr. TurnerBest Editing:Sandra Adair – BoyhoodRunner-up: Barney Pilling – The Grand Budapest HotelBest Production Design:Adam Stockhausen – The Grand Budapest HotelRunner-up: Ondřej Nekvasil – SnowpiercerBest Music Score (TIE):Jonny Greenwood – Inherent ViceMica Levi – Under the SkinBest Foreign Language Film:Ida • PolandRunner-up: Winter Sleep • TurkeyBest Documentary/Non-Fiction Film:CitizenfourRunner-up: Life ItselfBest Animation:The Tale of the Princess KaguyaRunner-up: The Lego MovieNew Generation Award:Ava DuVernayCareer Achievement Award:Gena RowlandsThe Douglas Edwards Experimental/Independent Film/Video Award:'Walter Reuben – The David Whiting Story''

References

External links
 40th Annual Los Angeles Film Critics Association Awards

2014
Los Angeles Film Critics Association Awards
Los Angeles Film Critics Association Awards
Los Angeles Film Critics Association Awards
Los Angeles Film Critics Association Awards